Nick Kenny may refer to:

 Nick Kenny (rugby league), Australian rugby league footballer
 Nick Kenny (poet), American poet, newspaper columnist, and song lyricist
 Nick Kenny (darts player) (born 1993), Welsh darts player